Fulgencio Hernández (born 1 January 1941) is a Guatemalan long-distance runner. He competed in the marathon at the 1968 Summer Olympics.

References

1941 births
Living people
Athletes (track and field) at the 1968 Summer Olympics
Guatemalan male long-distance runners
Guatemalan male marathon runners
Olympic athletes of Guatemala
People from Jalapa Department